Vincent Gauthier-Manuel (born 6 April 1986) is a French alpine skier and Paralympic athlete.

He competed in the 2014 Winter Paralympics in Sotchi, Russia.
He won a gold medal in the Slalom, standing, and a bronze medal in the Giant Slalom, standing. 
Gauthier was awarded the National Order of Merit in 2010.

Golf
Although he was born missing most of his left arm, Gauthier started to play golf in 2013. He played his first Pro-AM before the Saint-Omer Open in 2014.

References

External links

 
 
 
 Golfer

1986 births
Living people
French male alpine skiers
Paralympic alpine skiers of France
Paralympic silver medalists for France
Paralympic bronze medalists for France
Paralympic medalists in alpine skiing
Alpine skiers at the 2010 Winter Paralympics
Alpine skiers at the 2014 Winter Paralympics
Medalists at the 2010 Winter Paralympics
Medalists at the 2014 Winter Paralympics
21st-century French people